Nevada Gold Mines was formed on July 1, 2019, as a joint venture between Barrick Gold Corporation (61.5% ownership) and Newmont Corporation (38.5% ownership) through the combination of their significant gold mining assets across northern Nevada. The assets in Nevada Gold Mines include 10 underground mines and 12 surface mines as well as related  facilities. Barrick Gold is the operator of Nevada Gold Mines, and plans 200 MW of Ohio-made solar panels for 2023.

Mining operations
 Carlin
 Cortez Gold Mine
 Goldstrike mine
 Long Canyon
 Phoenix
 Turquoise Ridge

See also
Gold mining in Nevada
List of active gold mines in Nevada

References 

American companies established in 2019
2019 establishments in Nevada
Elko, Nevada
Companies based in Nevada
Gold mining companies of the United States
Gold mining in Nevada